Robert Dingley (1619–1660), was an English puritan divine, who supported the Parliamentary cause in the English Civil War.

Biography
Dingley, a second son of Sir John Dingley, and a sister of Dr. Henry Hammond, was born in 1619. In 1634 he entered Magdalen College, Oxford. Having finished his university career and taken his degree of M.A., he took holy orders.

On the outbreak of the civil war he took the parliamentary side. Dingley was presented to the rectory of Brightstone in the Isle of Wight during the governorship of his kinsman, Colonel Robert Hammond, and enjoyed a high reputation as a preacher. He gave active assistance to the commissioners of Hampshire in rejecting ignorant and scandalous ministers and schoolmasters. He died at Brightstone on 12 January 1660.

Works
Dingley's works were:
 The Spiritual Taste Described, or a Glimpse of Christ Discovered, 1649, republished as Divine Relishes of matchless Goodness, 1651. 
 The Deputation of Angels, 1654, London. 
 Messiah's Splendour, or the Glimpsed Glory of a Beauteous Christian, 1654.
 Divine Optics, or a Treatise of the Eye discovering the Vices and Virtues thereof, 1655.
 Vox Cœli, or Philosophicall, Historicall, and Theological Observations of Thunder, 1658.
 A Sermon on Job xxvi. 14, 1658.

For expressing himself unfavourably about the Quakers he was attacked by George Fox in his Great Mystery, 1659, p. 361.

Notes

References
 endnotes:
Brook's Puritans, iii. 314; 
Granger's Biog. Hist. (1779), iii. 35;
Wood's Athenæ Oxon. (Bliss), iii. 487.
As to the Hampshire Commission see The Country's Concurrence with the London United Ministers in their late Heads of Agreement, by Samuel Chandler, D.D., 1691.

External links
 — "Ordered, That the Ordinance for putting Mr. Dingley in a Living in the Isle of Wight be read the next Day appointed for Church Business."

1619 births
1660 deaths
English theologians
Roundheads